The Type 15 (also designated ZTQ-15), nicknamed the Black Panther, is a Chinese third generation light tank operated by the People's Liberation Army Ground Force and People's Liberation Army Navy Marine Corps. It could become a successor to the Type 62 light tank that was retired from the Chinese army in 2013.

Development
During development, the Type 15 was repeatedly sighted by Chinese citizens, with sightings as early as 2011. The Type 15 entered mass production in 2016. On December 2018, the tank was officially acknowledged to be in active service.  It was showcased in the 70th National Day parade on October 1, 2019.

Design

Overview
The Type 15 is designed to fulfill the requirement for a lighter, more mobile modern tank that can effectively operate in highland/plateau, woodland and water-rich regions where the heavier Type 99 and Type 96 main battle tanks might have difficulties traversing.

In the high altitude region like Tibet, the air becomes thin and engines start to lose power. Heavily-armored vehicles such as T-72 and T-90 main battle tanks will have difficulty to traverse in the hypoxic environment, but the Type-15 light tank can operate at high altitudes with its powerful engine and oxygen generators. The new tank is also much more mobile than heavier main battle tanks due to its light weight and high power/weight ratio.

Armament
Type 15 light tank features a fully-stabilized 105 mm rifled gun, which is reportedly superior to the old ZPL-94 105 mm rifled gun fitted on Type 88 and Type 59 tanks. It is reported that the main gun has an effective firing range of 3 km and is compatible with all standard NATO 105 mm tank ammunition. The sustained fire rate is supported by a bustle-mounted autoloader system, which reduces the crew to 3. The spent cases are ejected automatically via a hatch at the turret rear. The Type 15 tank can hold 38 rounds of various 105 mm shells.

The ammunition selections include APFSDS, HEAT and HE (High explosive) rounds and gun-launched ATGM. APFSDS and HEAT rounds are used against enemy armor while HE round is used against enemy infantry positions, light/non-armored vehicles, buildings, and field fortifications.

The penetration capabilities of 105 mm APFSDS are not considered as sufficient to penetrate the front armor of modern main battle tanks such as T-90 or VT-4. To defeat well-protected opponents, the tank would use the 105 mm gun-launched ATGM with tandem high-explosive anti-tank (HEAT) warheads, offering much higher penetration. The missile reportedly has a range of 5 km and is capable of engaging low-flying helicopters. 

Other armament includes a QJT-88 5.8 mm coaxial machine gun, a remotely-controlled weapon station mounted on the turret roof, which is fitted with QLZ-04 35 mm automatic grenade launcher and QJC-88 12.7 mm heavy machine gun.

Electronics
Type 15 features modern sensory and fire control systems, including laser rangefinder, advanced ballistic computer, meteorological sensors, gunner thermal imaging sight, millimeter-wave radar, and commander's panoramic sight. The fire control system supports automatic target tracking, hunter-killer capabilities, and commander takeover.

Other equipment includes air conditioning system, oxygen-production equipment for the crew, command and control equipment, battlefield management system, and navigation suite fitted with both inertial navigation system (INS) and satellite navigation system.

Protection
Unlike previous Chinese tanks with carousel-style autoloader, the ammunition in Type 15 is retrieved from a tail autoloader with blowout panels. The ammunitions are stored in the turret bustle for improved safety.

Type 15 tank features two sets of armor packages providing different tactical mobility. Standard armor package features steel armor protection with additional layers of advanced composite armor panels covering the tank turret, hull, and two sides, with additional lightweight explosive reactive armor blocks protecting the front hull. The enhanced package features thicker explosive reactive armor (ERA) blocks, in addition to the composite armor panels underneath, covering the whole tank turret and hull. ERA mounted armor-skirt and slat armor can also be mounted on the side and rear side of the tank hull for additional protection. Enhanced armor set is designed for open area battle under heavy defensive conditions.

The Type 15 light tank is fitted with a laser warning sensor system to detect incoming rangefinding and anti-tank missiles, and the tank can automatically deploy smoke grenades in dischargers if the tank is being illuminated by enemy laser beam. Chinese-designed active protection system can be mounted on export-oriented VT-5 variant as per customer request. Other protective features include chemical, biological, radiological and nuclear (CBRN) protection, and fire suppression system. The vehicle also features oxygen generators to aid in high-altitude operations.

Mobility
The Type 15 is powered by a 1,000 hp (746 kW) electronically controlled diesel engine, with hydro-mechanical full automatic transmission. The tank is also capable of neutral steering and features hydropneumatic suspension.

Due to its lighter weight, the Type 15 tank can be more easily airlifted. Y-20 transport planes can only carry one Type 99 tank but can carry up to two Type 15 tanks and achieve long-range deployment of 7,800 kilometers. ZTQ-15 can also be paradropped by the transport aircraft.

Operational history
During the China-India border dispute along the Line of Actual Control (LAC) in June 2020, Type 15 tanks were reportedly deployed in the Tibetan Plateau.

Variants

 
Type 15 / ZTQ-15 Designation for military version.
Type 15 Armored Recovery Vehicle Recovery vehicle based on Type 15 chassis.
VT-5 Different design similar to the ZTQ-15 that is made for export. There are noticeable design differences. The driver's hatch on the VT-5 is positioned at the center front hull whereas the ZTQ-15 driver's hatch is located on the left. The upper front hull of the VT-5 is noticeably curved whereas the ZTQ-15 is straight. The modular add-on armor kits are also noticeably different.
VT-5BD Customized variant of VT-5 made for Bangladesh Army. The main armament 105 mm rifled gun is improved with thermal sleeve and fume extractor system. The tanks are equipped with GL-5 APS, but the automatic 12.7 mm machine gun has been replaced with a manual one.

Operators

: 400 units as of 2021.
: 20
 People's Liberation Army Air Force Airborne Corps

: 44 VT-5BD units

See also 

Type 62 - Chinese light tank

Contemporary competitors
Kaplan MT / Harimau - Turkish / Indonesian light tank.
General Dynamics Griffin II - New American light tank, currently in US Army trials
Sabrah light tank - Spanish / Israeli light tank based on ASCOD, ordered by Philippines

Tanks with similar firepower
M8 Armored Gun System - American light tank proposal was canceled in the 1990s
2S25 Sprut-SD - Russian amphibious light tank
K21-105 - Korean light tank

References

Light tanks of the People's Republic of China
Tanks with autoloaders
Post–Cold War light tanks
Military vehicles introduced in the 2010s
Norinco